Kilwinning Rangers Football Club are a Scottish football club based in the town of Kilwinning, Ayrshire.  Formed in 1899, the club competes in the West of Scotland Football League, and are eligible to participate in the Scottish Cup. Nicknamed The Buffs, they play in blue and white hoops. Home matches are played at Buffs Park, within Kilwinning Sports Club, where the club moved prior to the 2019–20 season having spent 90 years at Abbey Park.

History 
Kilwinning Rangers were originally formed as a Juvenile football club in 1899, sharing Blacklands Park with the local senior club - the now defunct Kilwinning Eglinton.  In 1902 the club joined the Junior grade however it was three years before the club won their first honour, emerging as winners of the Ayrshire Junior Challenge Cup in 1904–05.

They became the first Ayrshire club to win the Scottish Junior Cup in 1908–09 with a 1–0 victory over Strathclyde A second appearance in the final followed in 1909–10, however Kilwinning were defeated 3-0 by Ashfield. Ninety years later, Kilwinning regained the Scottish Junior Cup with a 1–0 victory over Kelty Hearts, in a season which saw them win six out of the seven trophies available to them.

Kilwinning became the first Ayrshire side to win the West Super League in 2003–04 however financial issues resulted in the team finishing bottom of the league the following season and subsequently relegated.  Most of the following decade was spent in the Ayrshire District League with a promotion to the Super First Division achieved in 2012–13.  The following season almost resulted in Kilwinning avoiding relegation, however the club had fielded an ineligible player for twelve matches and the resulting nineteen point deduction relegated the side to the bottom division.

A change in management occurred in February 2014 with the appointment of Chris Strain and Colin Stewart, although Stewart left to take up a coaching role at Rangers in 2015 and Strain assumed the role of sole manager.

Kilwinning achieved successive promotions in 2014-15 and 2016–17, courtesy of a play-off victory against Shettleston and maintained their top flight status the following season by defeating Kilsyth Rangers in another play-off.

In 2020, Kilwinning applied to join the newly formed West of Scotland Football League, which would see them leave the Junior leagues after joining 118 years prior The following year, Kilwinning began their application to join the Scottish Football Association. This application was successful in June 2022, allowing the Buffs to participate in the Scottish Cup for the first time in the history in the 2022–23 season.

In early April 2022, Chris Strain was sacked. Former player and ex-professional, Mark Campbell was appointed caretaker manager until the end of the season. Broomhill manager David Gormley was hired for the start of the next season.

Scottish Cup
Kilwinning Rangers made their first ever foray into the Scottish Cup in the 2022–23 season; defeating Rutherglen Glencairn and Tranent, before succumbing to Scottish League Two side Forfar Athletic.

Nickname 
Several theories exists as to the origin of the nickname "Buffs".  Historic maps of Kilwinning show the site of the present day Abbey Park to have been within an area known as "The Butts", "was an open area used for archery. There is no misspelling", a misspelling of which may have led to the synonym.

Another theory is that one of the players around that time was a member of the East Kent Regiment of the British Army, who were nicknamed The Buffs.

Ground 
Several grounds were used by the club in the early years of its existence.  Initially Kilwinning moved to a ground named Woodwynd Park which was located on Woodwynd itself, between Hamilton Street and Kilrig Avenue.  Several years later the club began playing at Claremont Park, near to the now demolished Kilwinning East railway station.  The Buffs moved to Abbey Park (near Kilwinning Abbey) in 1929 and remained there until 2019.

At the start of the 2019–20 season they relocated to the Kilwinning Sports Club ground in Pennyburn on the outskirts of the town which was upgraded and renamed Buffs Park.

In April 2020, the club agreed to buy the former Old Trafford floodlights from non-league York City to upgrade Buffs Park to SPFL standards, however, the plan fell through.

A seated stand was added ahead of the 2020-21 West of Scotland Football League season; with the new floodlights following the next year.

Current squad 
As of 23 February 2023

First team

On loan

Development Squad

Management team
As of 27 January 2023

U20 management team
As of 15 July 2022

Honours

Senior
West of Scotland Football League Cup 
 Runners-up: 2021–22

Junior
Scottish Junior Cup
Winners (2): 1908–09, 1998–99
 Runners-up (2): 1909–10, 1921–22

West of Scotland Super League Premier Division
Winners: 2003–04
 Runners-up: 2019–20

Ayrshire District League
Winners: 2012–13

Other honours
 West of Scotland Cup winners (2): 1993–94, 1998–99
 Ayrshire First Division winners (2): 1998–99, 1999–00
 Western Junior League winners (6): 1920–21, 1922–23, 1927–28, 1930–31, 1931–32, 1965–66
 Ayrshire Second Division winners (3): 1980–81, 1988–89, 1990–91
 Ayrshire Cup (11): 1904–05, 1908–09, 1934–35, 1976–77, 1985–86, 1994–95, 1997–98, 1998–99, 1999–00, 2001–02, 2017–18
 Ayrshire League Cup (2): 1929–30, 1998–99
 Ayrshire District Cup (8): 1905–06, 1920–21, 1931–32, 1958–59, 1995–96, 1998–99, 2000–01, 2001–02
 North Ayrshire Cup (4): 1995–96, 1997–98, 1999–00, 2000–01
 Western Intermediate League Cup: 1929–30
 Irvine & District League (3): 1907–08, 1908–09, 1913–14
 Eglinton Cup (2): 2021, 2022
 Lady Darling Supplementary Cup: 2005–06

Notable players
1. Players that have played/managed in the Scottish Championship or any foreign equivalent or higher than this level (i.e. fully professional league).
2. Players with full international caps.
3. Players that hold a club record or have captained the club.

 Derek Anderson
 Jamie Barclay 
 Mark Campbell
 Martyn Campbell 
 Duncan Currie
 Garry Fleming
 Dylan Kerr
 Mark Lamont
 Dylan Mackin
 David McKellar
 Marc McKenzie
 Colin Meldrum
 Mark Millar
 Chris Millar
 Carlo Monti
 Craig Pettigrew
 Ross Stewart (2 caps, 0 goals)
 Stephen Swift
 David Syme 
 Michael Wardrope
 David Winters

References

External links
 Club Website
 
 

 
Football clubs in Scotland
Football in North Ayrshire
Association football clubs established in 1899
Scottish Junior Football Association clubs
Kilwinning
1899 establishments in Scotland
West of Scotland Football League teams